Panobacumab (proposed INN) is a monoclonal antibody designed as an antibacterial against Pseudomonas aeruginosa.

It is a fully human pentameric IgM antibody with a mouse J chain.

Development

Panobacumab is being developed by Aridis Pharmaceuticals. As of November 15th it is in phase 2 clinical trials. The originator was Berna Biotech.

The mechanism of action is as a lipopolysaccharide inhibitor.

References

Monoclonal antibodies
Experimental drugs